Holle is a village and a municipality in the district of Hildesheim, in Lower Saxony, Germany. It is situated approximately 15 km southeast of Hildesheim, and 15 km west of Salzgitter. It was mentioned in Tom Clancy's bestseller Red Storm Rising.

References

External links 

Hildesheim (district)